Claife is a civil parish in the South Lakeland district of Cumbria, England. It is situated west of Windermere, and east of Esthwaite Water and the village of Hawkshead. In the 2001 census the parish had a population of 392, reducing to 298 at the 2011 census. Settlements in the parish include two villages, Near and Far Sawrey in the south; and the hamlets of High Wray, Low Wray, Colthouse and Loanthwaite in the north.

There is one major road in the parish, the B5285 connecting Hawkshead to the Windermere Ferry terminus at Far Sawrey.

At Low Wray is Wray Castle, a 19th-century house and grounds now owned by the National Trust. Many of the woodlands in the parish, including the area alongside Windermere are part of the National Trust's Hawkshead and Claife property.

See also

Listed buildings in Claife

References

External links
 Cumbria County History Trust: Claife (nb: provisional research only – see Talk page)

Civil parishes in Cumbria
South Lakeland District